Philip "The King" Morris (born May 11, 1965) is an American former professional stock car racing driver from Ruckersville, Virginia. He has won five Whelen All-American Series championships and competed in twelve NASCAR Busch Series races, finishing fifth in his debut. Morris has also won the ValleyStar Credit Union 300 three times, the most of any driver.

Craftsman Truck Series career

Morris made one career start in the Craftsman Truck Series, his major league NASCAR debut, which came in 1997. Starting 24th in the field at Martinsville, Morris had an engine let go early and would finish last in the 36-truck field.

Busch Series career
Morris made his NASCAR Busch Series debut at the North Carolina Speedway in Rockingham, NC in November 1998, driving the No. 84 Chevy. He started 12th and finished in fifth.

In 1999 he made 3 races driving the No. 01 Blue Ridge Motorsports Chevrolet. At the Las Vegas Motor Speedway in March, he started in 8th and finished 35th, three laps down. At South Boston Speedway in June, Morris started 26th and finished 7th. In August he made his 3rd and final start of 1999 at Bristol, starting 28th and finishing 29th.

In 2000, Morris drove 6 races for Innovative Motorsports in the #30 Little Trees Chevrolet. In his 6 starts, he had a best starting position of 8th at South Boston and a best finish of 28th at South Boston, as well.

Morris did not have much success after that, and in 2001 raced his three last NASCAR races. He was 30th and 34th in two races for Jay Robinson Racing, with the better coming at Charlotte and then 40th in a race for Hensley Racing at Rockingham.  He is often referred to as one of the greatest late model drivers to have existed, with the general consensus being that his name was what stopped him from breaking into the top levels of stock car racing. At the time, NASCAR's top series was sponsored by Winston, owned by R. J. Reynolds Tobacco Company, a competitor of Philip Morris International, which owns brands such as Marlboro. There was never evidence of any connection between the driver and the company.

External links

References

NASCAR drivers
1965 births
Living people
People from Greene County, Virginia
Racing drivers from Virginia